Shah Vali (also romanized as Shāh Valī; also known as Qabr Bābā and Qīr-e Bābā Shāh Valī) is a village in Jalalvand Rural District, Firuzabad District, Kermanshah County, Kermanshah Province, Iran. At the 2006 census, its population was 44, in 9 families.

References 

Populated places in Kermanshah County